The French ironclad Reine Blanche was a wooden-hulled armored corvette built for the French Navy in the late 1860s as an improvement over the armored corvette . She played a minor role in the Franco-Prussian War of 1870–1871 and was accidentally rammed by one of her sister ships in 1877. The ship bombarded the port of Sfax during the French occupation of Tunisia in 1881 before being sent to the Pacific in 1884. She quickly returned to port with worn-out boilers and was condemned later that year.

Design and description
The s were designed as improved versions of the armored corvette , suited for foreign deployments. Unlike their predecessor, the Alma-class ships were true central battery ironclads as they were fitted with armored transverse bulkheads. Like most ironclads of their era, they were equipped with a metal-reinforced ram.

Her crew numbered 316 officers and men.

Propulsion
The ship had a single horizontal return connecting-rod steam engine driving a single propeller. Her engine was powered by four oval boilers. On sea trials the engine produced  and the ship reached .

Armament
Reine Blanche mounted her four  Modèle 1864 breech-loading guns in the central battery on the battery deck. The other two 194-millimeter guns were mounted in barbettes on the upper deck, sponsoned out over the sides of the ship. The four  guns were also mounted on the upper deck. She may have exchanged her Mle 1864 guns for Mle 1870 guns. The guns could fire both solid shot and explosive shells.

Armor
The unarmored portions of her sides were protected by  iron plates.

Service
Reine Blanche was laid down at Lorient in 1865 and launched on 10 March 1868. The ship began her sea trials on 15 April 1869 and was put into reserve at Brest after they were completed. She was commissioned on 20 July 1870 and made one cruise to the Shetland Islands during the Franco-Prussian War before she was placed in reserve again on 20 September. Reine Blanche was recommissioned in July 1871 as flagship of the second division of the Evolutionary Squadron. During the Cantonal Revolution Reine Blanche and her sister  spent much of September–October 1873 in the port of Cartagena, Spain, where they could protect French citizens. She was reduced to reserve on 1 February 1876 and recommissioned in April 1877.

On 3 July 1877, she was accidentally rammed by Thétis off the Îles d'Hyères, Var and had to be run ashore to prevent her from sinking. Reine Blanche was placed back into reserve in 1878. She was recommissioned on 15 April 1879 for service with the Levant Squadron. From 5–16 July 1881 Reine Blanche bombarded the Tunisian port of Sfax as part of the French occupation of Tunisia. The ship was named as the flagship of the Pacific Squadron on 20 January 1884 under command of Rear Admiral Franquet, but she returned to Cherbourg on 22 May 1884 with worn-out boilers and her hull in poor shape. Reine Blanche was paid off and condemned on 12 November 1884.

Notes

Footnotes

References
 

 
 

Ships built in France
Alma-class ironclads
1868 ships
Maritime incidents in July 1877